The Sony FE 85mm F1.8 is a short telephoto full-frame prime lens for the Sony E-mount, released by Sony on February 7, 2017. 

The lens is one of Sony's first native lens offerings for the 85mm focal length. Though designed for Sony's full frame E-mount cameras, the lens can be used on Sony's APS-C E-mount camera bodies, with an equivalent full-frame field-of-view of 127.5mm.

Build quality
The lens features a weather resistant plastic exterior over plastic internals. It showcases recessed front lens element, focusing ring, and a matte black finish. On the side of the lens is a programmable focus-hold button.

Image quality
The lens is one of Sony's sharpest offerings for their E-mount cameras. The lens suffers from mild vignetting and almost no visible distortion or chromatic aberration.

See also
List of Sony E-mount lenses
Sony FE 85mm F1.4 GM
Zeiss Batis Sonnar T* 85mm F1.8

References

Camera lenses introduced in 2017
85